Stone the Crows were a Scottish blues rock band formed in Glasgow in late 1969. They are remembered for the onstage electrocution of guitarist and founding member Les Harvey.

History 
The band were formed after Maggie Bell was introduced to Les Harvey by his elder brother Alex Harvey. After playing together in the Kinning Park Ramblers, their next band Power was renamed Stone the Crows (after a British/Australian English exclamation of surprise or shock) by Led Zeppelin's manager, Peter Grant.  The band was co-managed by Grant and Mark London. London was associated with Lulu as the co-writer of her signature song, "To Sir With Love" and was also married to Lulu's manager, Marion Massey. London had also managed the predecessor band Cartoone, in which Peter Grant had a financial interest and featured Les Harvey on guitar.

Original line-up 
Maggie Bell, vocals
Les Harvey, guitar
Colin Allen, drums
James Dewar, bass and vocals
John McGinnis, keyboards

The band's first two albums were recorded with the original line up and Bell's vocals were described as being similar to Janis Joplin's.

Second line-up and onstage death of Les Harvey 
McGinnis and Dewar left the band in 1971 and were replaced by Ronnie Leahy and Steve Thompson.

Guitarist and co-founder Les Harvey was electrocuted onstage in front of a live audience at Swansea's Top Rank Suite in May 1972. Wires to the group's equipment were reportedly damaged by the audience and although the road crew attempted to repair the damage, they overlooked a loose ground wire. Harvey received a jolt of electricity as he reached for a microphone while his fingers touched the metal strings on his guitar. His body reportedly flew into the air and came to rest with his guitar in contact with the microphone stand. Bandmates who tried to rescue him reportedly got shocked themselves and it wasn't until someone kicked his guitar away that medical personnel were able to render aid. He was pronounced dead on arrival at the hospital.

Jimmy McCulloch would subsequently replace the main songwriter Harvey as lead guitarist, following Harvey's death. After Harvey's death the band reconsidered their direction.

Post-breakup 
Stone the Crows ultimately broke up in June 1973, and Peter Grant continued to manage Maggie Bell's career. Guided by Grant, Bell subsequently recorded two solo albums, Queen of the Night (1974) and Suicide Sal (1975) and an album with the Grant-managed band Midnight Flyer (1981). Bell is also known for her session work on Rod Stewart's album Every Picture Tells a Story (1971), in particular her co-lead vocal with Stewart on the album's title track (credited as "vocal abrasives").  Jimmy McCulloch joined Paul McCartney's group Wings, in Nashville, Tennessee, in 1974.

Discography

Studio albums 
Stone the Crows (1970)
Ode to John Law (1970)
Teenage Licks (1971)
Ontinuous Performance (1972) – UK number 33

Live albums 
The BBC Sessions, Volume 1 – 1969–1970 (1998)
The BBC Sessions, Volume 2 – 1970–1971 (1998)
Live Montreux 1972 (2002)
Radio Sessions 1969–1972 (2009) (2CD)
BBC Sessions 1969–1972 (2014) (2LP)

References

External links 

 Stone the Crows biography from linernotes by Chris Welch at Alex Gitlin's website

Scottish rock music groups
British blues rock musical groups
Musical groups established in 1969
Musical groups disestablished in 1973
Musical groups from Glasgow
Female-fronted musical groups